Lakeview High School (LHS) is a public high school located in St. Clair Shores, Michigan (U.S.). It is a part of the Lakeview Public Schools district.

References

External links
 

Public high schools in Michigan
Schools in Macomb County, Michigan